Anthocharis sara, the Sara Orangetip is one of three species in the Sara Orangetip complex. It is a California endemic butterfly with populations extending from Baja California into extreme southwest Oregon. The common name, Pacific Orangetip, is obsolete since its implied distribution includes two separate species.

Description 
Anthocharis sara is part of the three species-level taxa in the Anthocharis sara complex along with southwestern Orangetip (Anthocharis sara thoosa) and Julia Orangetip (Anthocharis julia).

Life history 
Like many butterfly species, they have strongly seasonal life cycles. A. sara have two consecutive flights at one point in the year and are not present for the other half of the year. They are a bivoltine species, meaning that each year they have two adult emergences. The first brood lives from late January to April and the second brood lives from May to early July. There has been known to occasionally be some overlap between the two generations. In captivity, the pupae of A. sara have been observed staying in diapase for up to three years. It is found in a variety of habitats including orchards, fields, meadows, and canyons.

Physical description 
Adult female Orange-tip has orange tips at the ends of its wings while the male has ultraviolet reflective tips that appear orange to human eyes but appear "bee purple" to the butterfly. Females lay creamy white eggs that turn orange-red a few hours after they are laid. Fifth instar A. sara larvae are a dark green color and have  small black pinacula. The larvae are a plain green color and when they mature they form a light brown thorn-shaped pupa.

Reproductive behavior 
During mating, the males carry out an act called patrolling, where they "fly a beat". This is them flying up and down a linear path and is used as a way to increase the likelihood of sexual encounters with females. Males usually patrol by the sides of streams and roads in the canyon bottoms. In these actions, there seems to be a hierarchy between the males where the "best" sites are taken up by the dominant males.

Host plants 
A. sara commonly lay their eggs on plants in the Mustard family (Cruciferae) such as Arabis perennans, Athysanus pusillus, and Brassica nigra. A. sara lay their eggs on the stems, pedicels, and the bases of petioles of these plants, and less commonly they have been known to lay their eggs on the buds, flowers, and leaves of these plants. When the larvae emerge they eat the buds, flowers, and fruits of the host plants.

A. sara have also been found on non-native host plants in California such as Barbarea verna, Barbarea vulagris, Brassica napus, Brassica nigra, Brassica rapa, Capsella bursa-pastoris, Hirschfeldia incana, Tropaeolum spp., Raphanus sativus,  Sinapis alba, Sinapis arvensis, and Sisymbrium officinale .

References

Anthocharis
Butterflies of North America
Butterflies described in 1852